The Roman emperor was the ruler and monarchial head of state of the Roman Empire during the imperial period (starting with the granting of the title augustus to Octavian in 27 BC). The emperors used a variety of different titles throughout history. Often when a given Roman is described as becoming "emperor" in English it reflects his taking of the title augustus (and later basileus). Another title often used was caesar, used for heirs-apparent, and imperator, originally a military honorific. Early emperors also used the title princeps civitatis ("first citizen"). Emperors frequently amassed republican titles, notably princeps senatus, consul, and pontifex maximus.

The legitimacy of an emperor's rule depended on his control of the army and recognition by the Senate; an emperor would normally be proclaimed by his troops, or invested with imperial titles by the Senate, or both. The first emperors reigned alone; later emperors would sometimes rule with co-emperors and divide administration of the empire between them.

The Romans considered the office of emperor to be distinct from that of a king. The first emperor, Augustus, resolutely refused recognition as a monarch. For the first three hundred years of Roman emperors, from Augustus until Diocletian, efforts were made to portray the emperors as leaders of the republic, fearing any association with the kings of Rome prior to the Roman Republic.

From Diocletian, whose tetrarchic reforms also divided the position into one emperor in the West and one in the East, until the end of the Empire, emperors ruled in an openly monarchic style and did not preserve the nominal principle of a republic, but the contrast with "kings" was maintained: although the imperial succession was generally hereditary, it was only hereditary if there was a suitable candidate acceptable to the army and the bureaucracy, so the principle of automatic inheritance was not adopted. Elements of the republican institutional framework (senate, consuls, and magistrates) were preserved even after the end of the Western Empire.

Constantine the Great moved the capital (Caput Mundi) from Rome to Constantinople, formerly known as Byzantium, in 330 AD and converted to Christianity. After this, the emperor came to be seen as God's chosen ruler, as well as a special protector and leader of the Christian Church on Earth, although in practice an emperor's authority on Church matters was subject to challenge. The Western Roman Empire collapsed in the late 5th century after multiple invasions of imperial territory by Germanic barbarian tribes. Romulus Augustulus is often considered to have been the last emperor of the West, until his forced abdication in 476, although Julius Nepos maintained a claim recognized by the Eastern Empire to the title until his death in 480. Following Nepos's death, the Eastern emperor Zeno abolished the division of the position and proclaimed himself as the sole emperor of a reunited Roman Empire. The subsequent Eastern emperors ruling from Constantinople continued to style themselves "Emperor of the Romans" (later βασιλεύς Ῥωμαίων in Greek), but are often referred to in modern scholarship as Byzantine emperors. 

The papacy and Germanic kingdoms of the West acknowledged the Eastern Emperors until the accession of Empress Irene in 797 and the Papacy then created a rival lineage of Roman emperors in western Europe, the Holy Roman Emperors, which ruled the Holy Roman Empire for most of the period between 800 and 1806. These emperors were never recognized as Roman emperors by the court in Constantinople and their coronations resulted in the medieval problem of two emperors. Most western historians treat Constantine XI Palaiologos, who died during the Fall of Constantinople to the Ottoman Empire in 1453 as the last meaningful claimant to the title Roman emperor. From 1453, one of the titles used by the Ottoman Sultans was "Caesar of Rome" part of their titles until the Ottoman Empire ended in 1922. A Byzantine group of claimant Roman emperors existed in the Empire of Trebizond until its conquest by the Ottomans in 1461, though they had used a modified title since 1282.

Background and beginning

Modern historians conventionally regard Augustus as the first emperor, whereas Julius Caesar is considered the last dictator of the Roman Republic, a view having its origins in the Roman writers Plutarch, Tacitus and Cassius Dio. Conversely, the majority of Roman writers, including Josephus, Pliny the Younger, Suetonius and Appian, as well as most of the ordinary people of the Empire, thought of Julius Caesar as the first emperor.

At the end of the Republic no new, and certainly no single, title indicated the individual who held supreme power. Insofar as emperor could be seen as the English translation of the Latin , then Julius Caesar had been an emperor, like several Roman generals before him. Instead, by the end of the civil wars in which Julius Caesar had led his armies, it became clear that there was certainly no consensus to return to the old-style monarchy, but that the period when several officials, bestowed with equal power by the Roman Senate, would fight one another had come to an end.

Julius Caesar, and then Augustus after him, accumulated offices and titles of the highest importance in the Republic, making the power attached to those offices permanent, and preventing anyone with similar aspirations from accumulating or maintaining power for themselves. Julius Caesar held the Republican offices of consul four times and dictator five times, was appointed dictator in perpetuity in 45 BC and had been  for a long period. He gained these positions by senatorial consent, and just prior to his assassination was the most powerful man in the Roman world.

In his will, Caesar appointed his adopted son Octavian as his heir. On Caesar's death, Octavian inherited his adoptive father's property and lineage, the loyalty of most of his allies and – again through a formal process of senatorial consent – an increasing number of the titles and offices that had accrued to Caesar. A decade after Caesar's death, Octavian's victory over his erstwhile ally Mark Antony at Actium put an end to any effective opposition and confirmed Octavian's supremacy.

His "restoration" of powers to the Senate and the people of Rome was a demonstration of his  and pious respect for tradition.

Some later historians such as Tacitus would say that even at Augustus's death, the true restoration of the Republic might have been possible. Instead, Augustus actively prepared his adopted son Tiberius to be his successor and pleaded his case to the Senate for inheritance on merit. Once in power, Tiberius took considerable pains to observe the forms and day-to-day substance of republican government.

Constitutional role

Rome had no single constitutional office, title or rank exactly equivalent to the English title "Roman emperor". Romans of the Imperial era used several titles to denote their emperors, and all were associated with the pre-Imperial, Republican era.

The titles customarily associated with the imperial dignity were imperator ("commander", which emphasizes the emperor's military supremacy and is the source of the English word emperor), Caesar, and Augustus ("majestic" or "venerable", which had tinges of the divine). In Greek, these three titles were rendered as autokratōr (""), kaisar (""), and augoustos ("") or sebastos ("") respectively. "Caesar" was originally a name but came to be used for the designated heir as Nobilissimus Caesar ("Most Noble Caesar") and was retained upon accession, while "Augustus" was adopted upon accession. In Diocletian's Tetrarchy, the traditional seniorities were maintained: "Augustus" was reserved for the two senior emperors and "Caesar" for the two junior emperors – each delegated a share of power and responsibility but each an emperor-in-waiting, should anything befall his senior. The emperors avoided the Latin title of rex ("king"), which would have implied the abolition of the Republic. In Greek, basileus ("king") came to be used for the emperor (and primarily came into favour after the reign of Heraclius) as the Greeks had no republican sensibility and openly viewed the emperor as a monarch.

Powers under the Principate
The power of the emperor derived from both his great personal prestige (dignitas) and his legal authority (auctoritas).

The legal authority of the emperor derived from an extraordinary concentration of individual powers and offices that were extant in the Republic and developed under Augustus and later rulers, rather than from a new political office. Under the Republic these powers would have been split between several people, who would each exercise them with the assistance of a colleague and for a specific period of time. Augustus held them all at once by himself, and with no time limits; even those that nominally had time limits were automatically renewed whenever they lapsed. The Republican offices endured and emperors were regularly elected to the most prominent of them: the consulship and censorship. 

The most important bases of the emperor's auctoritas were the greater power of command (imperium maius) and tribunician power (tribunicia potestas) as personal qualities, separate from his public office. 

The powers of command had two components: consular imperium while he was in Rome, and imperium maius outside of Rome. While inside the walls of Rome, the reigning consuls and the emperor held equal authority, each being able to veto each other's proposals and acts, with the emperor holding all of the consul's powers, but outside of Rome, the emperor outranked the consuls and could veto them without the same effects on himself. Imperium maius also granted the emperor authority over all the provincial governors, making him the ultimate authority in provincial matters and gave him the supreme command of all of Rome's legions. With imperium maius, the emperor was also granted the power to appoint governors of imperial provinces without the interference of the Senate. Also, imperium maius granted the emperor the right to veto the governors of the provinces and even the reigning consuls while in the provinces.

The tribunician power, first assumed by Augustus in 23 BC, was the authority of the tribune of the plebs without actually holding the office. As a result, he formally outranked provincial governors and ordinary magistrates. He had the right to enact or revoke sentences of capital punishment, was owed the obedience of private citizens (privati) and by the terms of the ius auxiliandi could save any plebeian from any patrician magistrate's decision. He could veto any act or proposal of any magistrate, including the tribunes of the people (ius intercedendi or ius intercessionis). His person was held to be inviolable (sacrosanct) of his person. The tribunician power alowed him to prosecute anyone who interfered with the performance of his duties. The emperor's tribuneship granted him the right to convene the Senate at his will and lay proposals before it, as well as the ability to veto any act or proposal by any magistrate, including the actual tribune of the plebeians. Also, as holder of the tribune's power, the emperor would convoke the Council of the People, lay legislation before it, and served as the council's president. The tribunician power theoretically applied only within the city of Rome. 

As princeps senatus (leader of the Senate), the emperor declared the opening and closure of each Senate session, declared the Senate's agenda, imposed rules and regulation for the Senate to follow, and met with foreign ambassadors in the name of the Senate. Being pontifex maximus (chief priest of the College of Pontiffs) made the emperor the chief administrator of religious affairs, granting him the power to conduct all religious ceremonies, consecrate temples, control the Roman calendar (adding or removing days as needed), appoint the vestal virgins and some flamens, lead the Collegium Pontificum, and summarize the dogma of the Roman religion. Gratian surrendered this office to Pope Siricius in AD 382; it eventually became an auxiliary honor of the Bishop of Rome.

Roman magistrates on official business were expected to wear the form of toga associated with their office; different togas were worn by different ranks; senior magistrates had the right to togas bordered with purple. A triumphal imperator of the Republic had the right to wear the toga picta (of solid purple, richly embroidered) for the duration of the triumphal rite. During the Late Republic, the most powerful had this right extended. Pompey and Caesar are both thought to have worn the triumphal toga and other triumphal dress at public functions. Later emperors were distinguished by wearing togae purpurae (purple togas); hence the phrase "to don the purple" for the assumption of imperial dignity.

At some points in the Empire's history, the emperor's power was nominal; powerful praetorian prefects, masters of the soldiers and on a few occasions, other members of the Imperial household including Imperial mothers and grandmothers were the true source of power.

Powers under the Dominate
In 293, following the Crisis of the Third Century which had severely damaged Imperial administration, Emperor Diocletian enacted sweeping reforms that washed away many of the vestiges and façades of republicanism which had characterized the Augustan order in favor of a more frank autocracy. As a result, historians distinguish the Augustan period as the Principate and the period from Diocletian to the 7th-century reforms of Emperor Heraclius as the Dominate (from the Latin for "lord".)

Reaching back to the oldest traditions of job-sharing in the Republic, Diocletian established at the top of this new structure the Tetrarchy ("rule of four") in an attempt to provide for smoother succession and greater continuity of government. Under the Tetrarchy, Diocletian set in place a system of co-emperors styled Augustus, and junior colleagues styled Caesar. When a co-emperor retired (as Diocletian and his co-emperor Maximian did in 305) or died, a junior "Caesar" would succeed him and the co-emperors would appoint new Caesars as needed.

The four members of Tetrarchy shared military and administrative challenges by each being assigned specific geographic areas of the Empire. From this innovation, often but not consistently repeated over the next 187 years, comes the notion of an east–west partition of the Empire that became popular with historians long after the practice had stopped. The two halves of Empire, while often run as de facto separate entities day-to-day, were always considered and seen, legally and politically, as separate administrative divisions of a single, insoluble imperium by the Romans of the time.

When emperor Theodosius I died, his sons Arcadius and Honorius, already proclaimed Augusti, succeeded him. Eighty-five years later, following Germanic migrations which had reduced the Empire's effective control across Britannia, Gaul and Hispania and a series of military coups d'état which drove Emperor Nepos out of Italy, the idea of dividing the position of emperor was formally abolished by Emperor Zeno (480).

The Roman Empire survived in the east until 1453, but the marginalization of the former heartland of Italy to the empire had a profound cultural impact on the empire and the position of emperor. The Greek-speaking inhabitants were Romaioi (Ῥωμαῖοι), and were still considered Romans by themselves and the populations of Eastern Europe and the Near East. The Ottoman Turks still used the term "Rûm" (Rome) when referring to the Eastern Empire. Meanwhile, the Tsardom of Russia proclaimed Moscow as the "Third Rome", regarding Constantinople as the "Second Rome".

However, many rulers in Western Europe began to refer to the political entity as the "Greek Empire", regarding themselves as the "true" successors of Rome. The evolution of the church in the no-longer imperial city of Rome and the church in the now supreme Constantinople began to follow divergent paths, culminating in the schism of 1054 between the Roman Catholic and Eastern Orthodox faiths. The position of emperor was increasingly influenced by Near Eastern concepts of kingship. Starting with Emperor Heraclius, Roman emperors styled themselves "basileus" (the title used by Alexander the Great) from 629 onwards. The later period of the Empire is today called the Byzantine Empire as a matter of scholarly convention, although this term is still debated.

Titles and positions
Although these are the most common offices, titles, and positions, not all Roman emperors used them, nor were all of them used at the same time in history. The consular and censorial offices especially were not an integral part of the Imperial dignity, and were usually held by persons other than the reigning emperor.
 Augustus: (also "" or ""), "Majestic" or "Venerable"; an honorific cognomen exclusive to the emperor
 Autokrator: (Autokratōr), (lit. "Self-ruler"); Greek title equivalent to imperator or commander-in-chief
 Basileus:, Greek for monarch, often translated as king, popularly used in the east to refer to the emperor; a formal title of the Roman emperor beginning with Heraclius
 Caesar: (also ""), initially the cognomen of Julius Caesar, it was transformed into a title; an honorific name later used to identify an emperor-designate
 Censor: a Republican office held jointly by two former consuls every five years for the purpose of conducting the lustrum that determined the role of citizens; the censor could audit all other magistrates and all state finances
 Consul: the highest magistracy of the Roman Republic with a one-year term and one coequal officeholder; the consul was the head of state within Rome. The last emperor to be bestowed the title by the Senate was Constans II, who was also the last emperor to visit Rome.
 Dominus ("Lord" or "Master"): an honorific title mainly associated with the Dominate
 Dominus Noster ("Our Lord"): an honorific title; the praenomen of later emperors.
 Imperator ("Commander" or "Commander-in-Chief"): a victory title taken on accession to the purple and after a major military victory
 Imperator Destinatus ("Destined to be Emperor"): heir apparent, used by Septimius Severus for Caracalla
 Invictus ("Unconquered"), an honorific title.
 Nobilissimus: (Nōbelissimos), ("Most Noble"), one of the highest imperial titles held by the emperor
 Pater Patriae ("Father of the Fatherland"): an honorific title
 Perpetuus ("Universal"): an honorific title of later emperors
 Pius Felix ("Pious and Blessed"): an honorific title
 Pontifex Maximus ("Supreme Pontiff" or "Chief Priest"): in the Republican era, the Pontifex Maximus was the head of the College of Pontiffs, the religious body that oversaw the ancestral public religion of the Romans; Julius Caesar had become Pontifex Maximus before he was elected consul, and the precedent set by his heir Augustus in consolidating supreme authority through this religious office was in general followed by his successors until the empire came under Christian rule
 Princeps ("First Citizen" or "Leading Citizen"): an honorific title denoting the status of the emperor as first among equals, associated mainly with the Principate
 Princeps Iuventutis: ("Prince of Youth"), an honorific title awarded to a presumptive emperor-designate
 Princeps Senatus: ("First Man of the Senate"), a Republican office with a five-year term
 Sebastos:, ("Venerable"); the Greek rendition of the imperial title Augustus
 Sebastokrator: (Sebastokratōr), ("Venerable Ruler); a senior court title from the compound words "sebastos" ("venerable", the Greek equivalent of the Latin Augustus) and "kratōr" ("ruler", the same element as is found in "autokratōr", "emperor")
 Tribunicia Potestas: ("Tribunician Power"); the powers of a tribune of the people, including sacrosanctity and inviolability of his person, and the veto over any decision by any other magistrate, assembly, or the Senate (the emperor could not be a "tribune" because a tribune was a plebeian by definition, therefore the emperor had all the powers of a tribune without actually being one)

Imperator

The title imperator dates back to the Roman Republic, when a victorious commander could be hailed as imperator in the field by his troops. The Senate could then award or withhold the extraordinary honour of a triumph; the triumphal commander retained the title until the end of his magistracy. In Roman tradition, the first triumph was that of Romulus, but the first attested recipient of the title imperator in a triumphal context is Aemilius Paulus in 189 BC. It was a title held with great pride: Pompey was hailed imperator more than once, as was Sulla, but it was Julius Caesar who first used it permanently – according to Cassius Dio, this was a singular and excessive form of flattery granted by the Senate, passed to Caesar's adopted heir along with his name and virtually synonymous with it.

In 38 BC, Agrippa refused a triumph for his victories under Octavian's command, and this precedent established the rule that the princeps should assume both the salutation and title of imperator. It seems that from then on Octavian (later the first emperor Augustus) used imperator as a first name (praenomen): Imperator Caesar not Caesar imperator. From this the title came to denote the supreme power and was commonly used in that sense. Otho was the first to imitate Augustus, but only with Vespasian did imperator (emperor) become the official title by which the ruler of the Roman Empire was known.

Princeps

The word princeps (plural principes), meaning "first", was a republican term used to denote the leading citizen(s) of the state. It was a purely honorific title with no attached duties or powers. It was the title most preferred by Augustus as its use implies only primacy, as opposed to imperator, which implies dominance. Princeps, because of its republican connotation, was most commonly used to refer to the emperor in Latin as it was in keeping with the façade of the restored Republic. 

As princeps senatus (lit., "first man of the senate"), the emperor could receive foreign embassies to Rome; some emperors (such as Tiberius) are known to have delegated this task to the Senate. In modern terms, these early emperors would tend to be identified as chiefs of state. The office of princeps senatus, however, was not a magistracy and did not entail imperium. 

In the era of Diocletian and beyond, princeps fell into disuse and was replaced with dominus ("lord"); later emperors used the formula Imperator Caesar NN. Pius Felix (Invictus) Augustus: NN representing the individual's personal name; Pius Felix meaning "Pious and Blest"; and Invictus meaning "undefeated". The use of princeps and dominus broadly symbolise the differences in the empire's government, giving rise to the era designations Principate and Dominate.

Lineages and epochs

Principate

The nature of the imperial office and the Principate was established under Julius Caesar's heir and posthumously adopted son, Augustus, and his own heirs, the descendants of his wife Livia from her first marriage to a scion of the distinguished Claudian clan. This Julio-Claudian dynasty came to an end when the Emperor Nero – a great-great-grandson of Augustus through his daughter and of Livia through her son – was deposed in 68.

Nero was followed by a succession of usurpers throughout 69, commonly called the "Year of the Four Emperors". The last of these, Vespasian, established his own Flavian dynasty. Nerva, who replaced the last Flavian emperor, Vespasian's son Domitian in 96, was elderly and childless, and chose therefore to adopt an heir, Trajan, from outside his family. When Trajan became emperor, he chose to follow his predecessor's example, adopting Hadrian as his own heir, and the practice then became the customary manner of imperial succession for the next century, producing the Five Good Emperors and the Empire's period of greatest stability.

The last of the Good Emperors, Marcus Aurelius, chose his natural son Commodus as his successor rather than adopting an heir. A brief period of instability quickly gave way to Septimius Severus, who established the Severan dynasty which, except for an interruption in 217–218 when Macrinus was emperor, held power until 235.

Crisis of the Third Century

The accession of Maximinus Thrax in 235 marks both the close and the opening of an era. It was one of the last attempts by the increasingly impotent Roman Senate to influence the succession. Yet it was the second time that a man become emperor purely as a result of his military career; both Vespasian and Septimius Severus had come from noble or middle-class families while Thrax was born a commoner. He never visited the city of Rome during his reign, which marks the beginning of a series of barracks emperors who came from the army. Between 235 and 285 over a dozen men became emperor, but only Valerian and Carus managed to secure their own sons' succession to the throne; both dynasties died out within two generations.

Dominate

The accession of Diocletian on 20 November 284, the lower-class, Greek-speaking Dalmatian commander of Carus's and Numerian's household cavalry (protectores domestici), marked major innovations in Rome's government and constitutional theory. Diocletian, a traditionalist and religious conservative, attempted to secure efficient, stable government and a peaceful succession with the establishment of the Tetrarchy. The Empire was divided into East and West, each ruled by an Augustus assisted by a Caesar as emperor-in-waiting. These divisions were further subdivided into new or reformed provinces, administered by a complex, hierarchic bureaucracy of unprecedented size and scope. Diocletian's own court was based at Nicomedia. His co-Augustus, Maximian, was based at Mediolanum (modern Milan). Their courts were peripatetic, and Imperial progressions through the provinces made much use of the impressive, theatrical adventus, or "Imperial arrival" ceremony, which employed an elaborate choreography of etiquette to emphasise the emperor's elevation above other mortals. Hyperinflation of imperial honours and titles served to distinguish the Augusti from their Caesares, and Diocletian, as senior Augustus, from his colleague Maximian. The senior Augustus in particular was made a separate and unique being, accessible only through those closest to him. The overall unity of the Empire still required the highest investiture of power and status in one man.

The Tetrarchy ultimately degenerated into civil war, but the eventual victor, Constantine the Great, restored Diocletian's division of Empire into East and West. He kept the East for himself and declared the city of Constantinople as its new capital. Constantine's own dynasty was also soon swallowed up in civil war and court intrigue until it was replaced, briefly, by Julian the Apostate's general Jovian and then, more permanently, by Valentinian I and the dynasty he founded in 364. Though a soldier from a low middle-class background, Valentinian was made emperor by a conclave of senior generals and civil officials.

Theodosius I acceded to power in the East in 379 and in the West in 394. He outlawed paganism and made Christianity the Empire's official religion. He was the last emperor to rule over a united Roman Empire; the distribution of the East to his son Arcadius and the West to his son Honorius after his death in 395 represented a permanent division.

Decline of the Western Roman Empire

In the Western Roman Empire, the office of emperor soon degenerated into being little more than a puppet of a succession of Germanic tribal kings, until finally the Heruli Odoacer simply overthrew the child-emperor Romulus Augustulus in 476, shipped the imperial regalia to the Emperor Zeno in Constantinople and became King of Italy.

Though during his own lifetime Odoacer maintained the legal fiction that he was actually ruling Italy as the viceroy of Zeno, historians mark 476 as the traditional date of the fall of the Western Roman Empire. Large parts of Italy (Sicily, the south part of the peninsula, Ravenna, Venice etc.), however, remained under actual imperial rule from Constantinople for centuries, with imperial control slipping or becoming nominal only as late as the 11th century. In the East, the Empire continued until the Fall of Constantinople to the Ottoman Turks in 1453. Although known as the Byzantine Empire by contemporary historians, the Empire was simply known as the Roman Empire to its citizens and neighboring countries.

Post-classical assertions to the title

Survival of the Roman Empire in the East

The line of Roman emperors in the Eastern Roman Empire continued unbroken at Constantinople until the capture of Constantinople in 1204 by the Fourth Crusade. In the wake of this action, four lines of emperors emerged, each claiming to be the legal successor: the Empire of Thessalonica, evolving from the Despotate of Epirus, which was reduced to impotence when its founder Theodore Komnenos Doukas was defeated, captured and blinded by the Bulgarian Emperor Ivan Asen II; the Latin Empire, which came to an end when the Empire of Nicaea recovered Constantinople in 1261; the Empire of Trebizond, whose importance declined over the 13th century, and whose claims were simply ignored; and the Empire of Nicaea, whose claims based on kinship with the previous emperors, control of the Patriarch of Constantinople, and possession of Constantinople through military prowess, prevailed. The successors of the emperors of Nicaea continued until the Fall of Constantinople in 1453 under Constantine XI Palaiologos.

These emperors eventually normalized the imperial dignity into the modern conception of an emperor, incorporated it into the constitutions of the state, and adopted the aforementioned title Basileus kai autokratōr Rhomaiōn ("Emperor and Autocrat of the Romans"). They had also ceased to use Latin as the language of state after Emperor Heraclius (d. 641 AD). Historians have customarily treated the state of these later Eastern emperors under the name "Byzantine Empire". It is important to note, however, that the adjective Byzantine, although historically used by Eastern Roman authors in a metonymic sense was never an official term.

Holy Roman Empire

The concept of the Roman Empire was renewed in the West with the coronation of the king of the Franks, Charlemagne (Charles the Great), as Roman emperor by the Pope on Christmas Day, 800. This coronation had its roots in the decline of influence of the Pope in the affairs of the Byzantine Empire at the same time the Byzantine Empire declined in influence over politics in the West. The Pope saw no advantage to be derived from working with the Byzantine Empire, but as George Ostrogorsky points out, "an alliance with the famous conqueror of the Lombards, on the other hand ... promised much".

The immediate response of the Eastern Roman emperor was not welcoming. "At that time it was axiomatic that there could be only one Empire as there could be only one church", writes Ostrogorsky. "The coronation of Charles the Great violated all traditional ideas and struck a hard blow at Byzantine interests, for hitherto Byzantium, the new Rome, had unquestionably been regarded as the sole Empire which had taken over the inheritance of the old Roman imperium. Conscious of its imperial rights, Byzantium could only consider the elevation of Charles the Great to be an act of usurpation."

Nikephoros I chose to ignore Charlemagne's claim to the imperial title, clearly recognizing the implications of this act. According to Ostrogorsky, "he even went so far as to refuse the Patriarch Nicephorus permission to dispatch the customary synodica to the Pope." Meanwhile, Charlemagne's power steadily increased: he subdued Istria and several Dalmatian cities during the reign of Irene, and his son Pepin brought Venice under Western hegemony, despite a successful counter-attack by the Byzantine fleet. Unable to counter this encroachment on Byzantine territory, Nikephoros's successor Michael I Rangabe capitulated; in return for the restoration of the captured territories, Michael sent Byzantine delegates to Aachen in 812 who recognized Charlemagne as Basileus. Michael did not recognize him as Basileus of the Romans, however, which was a title that he reserved for himself.

This line of Roman emperors was actually generally Germanic rather than Roman. These emperors used a variety of titles (most frequently Imperator Augustus) before finally settling on Imperator Romanus Electus ("Elected Roman Emperor"). Historians customarily assign them the title Holy Roman Emperor, which has a basis in actual historical usage, and treat their Holy Roman Empire as a separate institution. To Latin Catholics of the time, the Pope was the temporal authority as well as spiritual authority, and as Bishop of Rome he was recognized as having the power to anoint or crown a new Holy Roman Emperor. The last man to be crowned by the pope (although in Bologna, not Rome) was Charles V, who also had a claim to the throne of the Byzantine Empire through Andreas Palaiologos's designation of Ferdinand II of Aragon and Isabella I of Castile as his heirs. All his successors bore only a title of "Elected Roman Emperor".

This line of emperors lasted until 1806 when Francis II dissolved the empire during the Napoleonic Wars. Despite the existence of later potentates styling themselves "emperor", such as the Napoleons, the Habsburg Emperors of Austria, and the Hohenzollern heads of the German Reich, this marked the end of the Holy Roman Empire.

Ottoman Empire 

Under Sultan Mehmed II, the Ottoman Empire conquered Constantinople in 1453, an event generally regarded to have marked the definitive end of the Roman Empire, as well as the final and decisive step in the Ottoman conquest of the former empire's core lands and subjects.

After the conquest of Constantinople in 1453, the sultans of the Ottoman Empire laid claim to be the legitimate Roman emperors, in succession to the Byzantine emperors who had previously ruled from Constantinople. Mehmed had great interest in Roman and classical Greek history, a topic he had been taught on extensively by court teachers in his youth. He emulated himself on Julius Caesar and Alexander the Great, at one point visited the city of Troy to see the graves of the mythological Greek heroes Achilles and Ajax, and kept a copy of the Iliad in his personal library.

Based on the concept of right of conquest, the sultans at times assumed the styles kayser-i Rûm ("Caesar of Rome", one of the titles applied to the Byzantine emperors in earlier Ottoman writings) and basileus (the ruling title of the Byzantine emperors). The assumption of the heritage of the Roman Empire also led the Ottoman sultans to claim to be universal monarchs, the rightful rulers of the entire world.

The early sultans after the conquest of Constantinople—Mehmed II, Bayezid II, Selim I and Suleiman I—staunchly maintained that they were Roman emperors and went to great lengths to legitimize themselves as such. Greek aristocrats, i.e., former Byzantine nobility, were often promoted to senior administrative positions and Constantinople was maintained as the capital, rebuilt and considerably expanded under Ottoman rule. The administration, architecture and court ceremonies of the early post-1453 Ottoman Empire were heavily influenced by the former Byzantine Empire. The Ottoman sultan also used their claim to be Roman emperors to justify campaigns of conquest against Western Europe. Both Mehmed II and Suleiman I dreamt of conquering Italy, which they believed was rightfully theirs due to once having been the Roman heartland. Although the claim to Roman imperial succession never formally stopped and titles such as kayser-i Rûm and basileus were never formally abandoned, the claim gradually faded away and ceased to be stressed by the sultans.

Number of emperors
Several ancient writers tried to count the number of Roman emperors through history, but each of them gives a different count. The 4th-century historian Festus states that "From Octavian Caesar Augustus to Jovian, there were imperatores, 43 in number, through 407 years [reckoning from 43 BC]”. The 6th-century Chronicon Paschale calls Diocletian the "33rd Roman emperor". Adding the eight other emperors mentioned in the work would give a total of 41 emperors up until Constantine I. It's possible that the chronicle counts Julius Caesar as the first emperor, a view that is shared by most ancient writers.

A few writers also attempted to make their own lists of Roman emperors. The 4th-century calligrapher Filocalus, in his Chronographia, records 58 emperors from Augustus to Constantine. His contemporary Epiphanius records 44 emperors in his work On Weights and Measures. The 13th-century Chronicon Altinate records 46 emperors in the same time period. These discrepancies arise from the fact that there was never a defining distinction between "legitimate emperors" and "usurpers". The Chronicon Paschale, for example, describes Licinius as having been killed like "those who had briefly been usurpers before him". In reality, Licinius was the legitimate emperor of the West (having been appointed by Galerius), while Constantine was the real "usurper" (having been proclaimed by his troops). Other emperors had such uneventful or brief reigns that they are unmentioned by literary sources, like Licinius's co-emperors Valerius Valens and Martinian. In the later Eastern empire, co-emperors were no longer seen as "true" rulers given their submissive role to the senior emperor.

See also

 Roman imperial cult
 Interregnum
 Justitium
 Roman Emperors family tree
 Julio-Claudian family tree 
 Severan dynasty family tree
 Roman usurper

Lists
 List of Holy Roman emperors
 List of Ottoman sultans
 List of Italian monarchs
 List of Roman usurpers
 List of condemned Roman emperors
 List of Imperial Roman victory titles

References

Citations

Sources

Further reading

 Scarre, Chris. Chronicle of the Roman Emperors: The Reign-by-Reign Record of the Rulers of Imperial Rome. London: Thames & Hudson, 1995.

External links
 De Imperatoribus Romanis
 Rulers of Rome
 "Decadence, Rome and Romania, and the Emperors Who Weren't", by Kelley L. Ross, Ph.D.
 UNRV.com
 The Roman Law Library
 List of Greatest Roman Emperors
Emperors of Rome

20s BC establishments in the Roman Empire
1453 disestablishments
15th-century disestablishments in the Byzantine Empire
 
Emperor, Roman
Positions of authority